Kansas State University (KSU, Kansas State, or K-State) is a public land-grant research university with its main campus in Manhattan, Kansas. It was opened as the state's land-grant college in 1863 and was the first public institution of higher learning in the state of Kansas. It had a record high enrollment of 24,766 students for the Fall 2014 semester.

The university is classified among "R1: Doctoral Universities – Very high research activity". Kansas State's academic offerings are administered through nine colleges, including the College of Veterinary Medicine and the College of Technology and Aviation in Salina. Graduate degrees offered include 65 master's degree programs and 45 doctoral degrees.

Branch campuses are in Salina and Olathe. The Kansas State University Salina Aerospace and Technology Campus is home to the College of Technology and Aviation. The Olathe Innovation Campus has a focus on graduate work in research bioenergy, animal health, plant science and food safety and security.

History 
Kansas State University, originally named Kansas State Agricultural College, was founded in Manhattan on February 16, 1863, during the American Civil War, as a land-grant institution under the Morrill Act. The school was the first land-grant college created under the Morrill Act. K-State is the third-oldest school in the Big 12 Conference and the oldest public institution of higher learning in the state of Kansas.

The effort to establish the school began in 1861, the year that Kansas was admitted to the United States. One of the new state legislature's top priorities involved establishing a state university. That year, the delegation from Manhattan, led by New England abolitionist, Isaac Goodnow, introduced a bill to convert the private Blue Mont Central College in Manhattan, incorporated in 1858, into the state university. But the bill establishing the university in Manhattan was controversially vetoed by Governor Charles L. Robinson of Lawrence, and an attempt to override the veto in the Legislature failed by two votes. In 1862, another bill to make Manhattan the site of the state university failed by one vote. Finally, upon the third attempt on February 16, 1863, the state accepted Manhattan's offer to donate the Blue Mont College building and grounds and established the state's land-grant college at the site – the institution that would become Kansas State University.

When the college opened for its first session on September 2, 1863, it became only the second public institution of higher learning to admit women and men equally in the United States. Enrollment for the first session totaled 52 students: 26 men and 26 women. Twelve years after opening, the university moved its main campus from the location of Blue Mont Central College to its present site in 1875. The original site is now occupied by Central National Bank of Manhattan and Founders Hill Apartments.

The early years of the institution witnessed debate over whether the college should provide a focused agricultural education or a full liberal arts education. During this era, the tenor of the school shifted with the tenure of college presidents. For example, President John A. Anderson (1873–1879) favored a limited education and President George T. Fairchild (1879–1897) favored a classic liberal education. Fairchild was credited with saying, "Our college exists not so much to make men farmers as to make farmers men."

During this era, in 1873, Kansas State helped pioneer the academic teaching of home economics for women, becoming one of the first two colleges to offer the program of study.

In November 1928, the school was accredited by the Association of American Universities (AAU) as a school whose graduates were deemed capable of advanced graduate work. The name of the school was changed in 1931 to Kansas State College of Agriculture and Applied Science. In 1959, the Kansas legislature changed the name again to Kansas State University of Agriculture and Applied Science to reflect a growing number of graduate programs. However, in modern practice, the "Agriculture and Applied Science" portion has usually been omitted even from official documents such as state statutes. Milton S. Eisenhower served as president of the university from 1943 to 1950, and James McCain succeeded him, serving from 1950 to 1975. Several buildings, including residence halls and a student union, were added to the campus in the 1950s. The 1960s witnessed demonstrations against the Vietnam War, though fewer than at other college campuses. Enrollment was relatively high through most of the 1970s, but the university endured a downward spiral from approximately 1976 to 1986, when enrollment decreased to 17,570 and a number of faculty resigned. In 1986, Jon Wefald assumed the presidency of Kansas State University. During his tenure, enrollment and donations increased.

On June 15, 2009, Kirk Schulz became the 13th president of Kansas State University. In March 2010 he announced his K-State 2025 plan. The initiative is designed to elevate K-State to a top 50 nationally recognized research university by 2025. His last day was April 22, 2016, as he was selected as Washington State University's next president.

In late April 2016, Ret. General Richard Myers began serving as the interim president of Kansas State University and was announced as the permanent 14th president on November 15, 2016. He was succeeded by Richard Linton, a former dean of the College of Agriculture and Life Science at North Carolina State University (2012–2022).

Oldest public university in Kansas 

The state legislature established the state's land-grant college in Manhattan on January 13, 1863. A commission to establish a state university in Lawrence was called for later in the same legislative session, provided that town could meet certain requirements, and finalized later that year. Kansas State was the first public institution of higher learning founded in the state and began teaching college-level classes in 1863. By comparison, the University of Kansas opened in 1866, and offered only preparatory-level classes until college-level classes began in 1869.

Kansas State was founded with an agricultural and scientific college consistent with the land-grant college mandate, as well as departments for military science and literature. It was formally renamed as Kansas State University in 1959.

Campus 

The campus is historic, featuring more buildings built before 1910 than any other campus in Kansas. Holtz Hall, built in 1876, is the oldest free-standing building on campus. However, the oldest building on campus is the original section of Seaton Hall, which now forms Seaton Court, facing the courtyard of Hale Library and Eisenhower Hall. Originally named the Industrial Workshop, this section of Seaton Hall is the oldest remaining education building on the Manhattan campus.

The predominant architectural feature of the Manhattan campus is its use of native limestone. This includes the signature building at Kansas State University, Anderson Hall, developed in three stages between 1877 and 1885. Anderson Hall, now listed on the National Register of Historic Places, has housed the university's administrative offices for more than a century. Dickens Hall was constructed in 1908 and currently houses the statistics and philosophy departments. Although there are many historic building on the campus, since 1986 Kansas State has also added over two million square feet (186,000 m²) of new buildings to the campus, including an expanded library, new art museum, and plant sciences building.

Several of the buildings on campus were heavily damaged by an EF4 tornado on June 11, 2008. Damage estimates totaled more than $20 million. K-State paid a deductible of $5 million for their insurance to repair all damages.

Since 2014, the Main campus has been under significant renovation to accommodate infrastructure changes. The campus is also adopting a more walking friendly atmosphere by closing off many small access roads to vehicles.

Academics 

Since 1986, Kansas State ranks first nationally among public universities in its total of Rhodes, Marshall, Truman, Goldwater, and Udall scholars with 147 recipients. The school is a member of the Midwestern Association of Graduate Schools, and is home to the Kansas Beta chapter of the Phi Beta Kappa honor society. The institution petitioned in 1925, and three years later received, a charter of Mortar Board National College Senior Honor Society.

Kansas State University has 65 academic departments in nine colleges: Agriculture; Architecture, Planning and Design; Arts and Sciences; Business Administration; Education; Engineering; Health and Human Sciences; Technology and Aviation; and Veterinary Medicine. The graduate school offers 65 master's degree programs and nearly 50 doctoral programs.

In 1991, the former Kansas Technical Institute in Salina, Kansas was merged with Kansas State University by an act of the Kansas legislature. The College of Technology and Aviation is at the Salina campus. Initially, this campus was referred to as Kansas State University – Salina, but on October 14, 2014, the Kansas Board of Regents approved a name change to Kansas State University Polytechnic Campus. The campus was again renamed in 2021 to Kansas State University Salina Aerospace and Technology Campus.

In 2018, the Kansas Board of Regents approved that the name of the College of Engineering should be changed to the Carl R. Ice College of Engineering in Ice's honor.

Research

Agriculture 
The university has had a long-standing interest in agriculture, particularly native Great Plains plant and animal life. The Kansas State University Gardens is an on-campus horticulture display garden that serves as an educational resource and learning laboratory for K-State students and the public. The Konza Prairie is a native tallgrass prairie preserve south of Manhattan, which is co-owned by The Nature Conservancy and Kansas State University and operated as a field research station by the department of biology. The university also owns an additional  in cities across the state that it operates as Agricultural Experiment Stations in research centers in Hays, Garden City, Colby, and Parsons.

In 2006, K-State dedicated the Biosecurity Research Institute. The BRI, in Pat Roberts Hall, is a safe and secure location in which scientists and their collaborators can study high-consequence pathogens. It was designed and constructed for biosafety level 3 (BSL-3) and biosafety level 3 agriculture (BSL-3Ag) research.

Following the NBAF decision, leaders at two additional federal facilities announced they are coming to K-State. The Arthropod-Borne Animal Disease Research Unit, or ABADRU, specializes in animal and plant diseases transmitted by insects. The lab relocated from Laramie, Wyo., to K-State in order to fully realize its research mandate. The Center of Excellence for Emerging and Zoonotic Animal Diseases, or CEEZAD, will research foreign animal, zoonotic and newly discovered pathogens that can have a consequential economic impact on U.S. agriculture, homeland security and human and animal health. It will be led by K-State's Juergen Richt.

The university's extensive list of research facilities includes the James R. Macdonald Laboratory for research in atomic, molecular and optical physics and the NASA Center for Gravitational Studies in Cellular and Developmental Biology. The excimer laser, which made LASIK eye surgery possible, is a technology developed by Kansas State researchers.

Radio & television
Kansas State was involved in early experimentation with television and radio broadcasts. The first radio station licensed in Manhattan was Kansas State's experimental station 9YV. In 1912 the station began a daily broadcast (in morse code) of the weather forecast, becoming the first radio station in the U.S. to air a regularly-scheduled forecast. After a series of efforts to secure a more high-powered signal for the university – including a brief cooperation with John R. Brinkley's notorious KFKB – Kansas State was granted a license for KSAC, which began broadcasting with 500 watts of power on December 1, 1924. The station was reassigned to the frequency of AM 580 in 1928, and continued broadcasting on that frequency until November 27, 2002, when it made its last broadcast after the frequency was bought out by WIBW in Topeka, Kansas.

On March 9, 1932, the Federal Radio Commission granted Kansas State a license to operate the television station W9XAK. It was the first television station in Kansas. Activity on the station peaked in 1933 and 1934, with original programs being produced three nights a week. On October 28, 1939, the station broadcast the Homecoming football game in Manhattan between Kansas State and Nebraska, which was the second college football game ever televised. The station went off the air in 1939.

K-State Research Exchange
K-State Research Exchange referred to as K-REx is a local branding of Kansas State University's implementation of DSpace.

Kansas State University graduate students are required to submit an electronic version of their thesis, dissertation, or report, and then are made openly available through the K-State Research Exchange (K-REx), and become indexed by search engines.

Campus life 

The university is home to several museums, including the Marianna Kistler Beach Museum of Art, the KSU Historic Costume and Textiles Museum, the K-State Insect Zoo, and the Chang, Chapman, and Kemper galleries, which feature faculty and student artwork. The university also offers an annual cycle of performance art at McCain Auditorium, including concerts, plays and dance.

K-State is also known for several distinguished lecture series: Landon Lecture, Lou Douglas Lecture, Huck Boyd Lecture, and Dorothy L. Thompson Civil Rights Lectures. The Landon Lecture Series annually brings high-profile speakers to KSU – primarily current or former political or government leaders. Speakers in the last few years include President George W. Bush, President Bill Clinton, former Mexican President Vicente Fox and U.S. Supreme Court Justice Sonia Sotomayor. Overall, seven U.S. presidents and ten current or former foreign heads of state have given Landon Lectures at K-State since the series was inaugurated in 1966. The series is named after former Kansas governor and presidential candidate Alfred Landon.

The former All-University Convocation lecture series – which began with a speech by Harry Golden on April 3, 1963, and ended in 1997 – brought to campus prominent leaders such as Martin Luther King Jr., Supreme Court Justices Byron White and William O. Douglas, Senate Minority Leader Everett Dirksen, Rep. Shirley Chisholm, and thinkers such as Arthur C. Clarke, Benjamin Spock, Betty Friedan, Buckminster Fuller, and Saul Alinsky.

Student life 
K-State has twelve residence halls on campus: Boyd Hall, Ford Hall, Goodnow Hall, Haymaker Hall, Marlatt Hall, Moore Hall, West Hall, Putnam Hall, Van Zile Hall, and the new Wefald hall, completed in 2016. The Living Community at Jardine, and Smurthwaite, as well as Jardine Apartments. Smurthwaite, Ford, and Boyd Halls are all female. Haymaker and Marlatt Halls were all-male residence halls until the fall semesters of 2002 and 2009 respectively, when they became co-educational. The residence halls are divided into three complexes: Derby, Kramer, and Strong.

K-State implemented an academic honor code in 1999. When students are admitted, it is implied that they will adhere to the Honor Pledge: "On my honor, as a student, I have neither given nor received unauthorized aid on this academic work."

Kansas State has more than 400 student organizations. The Student Governing Association is the largest organization of student leaders, composed of elected and appointed officials. The Student Governing Association follows the model of the U.S. government, with executive, legislative and judicial branches.

The Association of Residence Halls (KSUARH) is the second largest organization of student leaders working towards better the on-campus living experience for students living in the Residence Halls around campus. GSA is the Graduate Student Association, and members include K-State's graduate-level business students. GSC is the Graduate Student Council, open to graduate-level students of all disciplines. Kansas State University also offers Army ROTC (Reserve Officers' Training Corps) and Air Force ROTC programs.

Student media includes KSDB-FM "Wildcat 91.9", KKSU-LD "Channel 8", the Kansas State Collegian, the Royal Purple Yearbook, and the "Purple Power Hour," "Manhattan Matters," & "Wildcat Watch".

Alma Mater is the name of the official school song of Kansas State University. In 1888, when the University was still Kansas State Agricultural College, H.W. Jones submitted the song as part of a school-wide contest. It was originally a four-stanza song and, over the years, some lyrics have changed. The song is sung at most K-State sporting events by fans, students and alumni. Wildcat Victory and Wabash Cannonball are both commonly used as fight songs. Wildcat Victory is used by many high schools as their fight song. Since the early 2010's, K-State students have chanted obscenities at sporting events toward their rival, the University of Kansas, to Darude's Sandstorm and the Wabash Cannonball. This tradition has continued despite the efforts of Hall of Fame Football Coach Bill Snyder, Kansas State Basketball Coach, Jerome Tang, and Band Director, Frank Tracz.

Fraternities and sororities 
There are several national and international social-leadership and service fraternities and sororities at Kansas State University:

Fraternities
 Acacia
 Alpha Gamma Rho
 Alpha Kappa Lambda
 Alpha Phi Alpha
 Alpha Phi Omega
 Alpha Sigma Phi
 Alpha Tau Omega
 Alpha Chi Sigma
 Beta Sigma Psi
 Beta Theta Pi
 Delta Chi
 Delta Lambda Phi
 Delta Sigma Phi
 Delta Upsilon
 FarmHouse
 Iota Phi Theta
 Kappa Alpha Psi
 Kappa Kappa Psi
 Kappa Sigma
 Lambda Chi Alpha
 Omega Delta Phi
 Omega Psi Phi
 Phi Beta Sigma
 Phi Delta Theta
 Phi Gamma Delta
 Phi Kappa Theta
 Pi Kappa Alpha
 Pi Kappa Phi
 Phi Mu Alpha Sinfonia
 Sigma Alpha Epsilon
 Sigma Chi
 Sigma Lambda Beta
 Sigma Phi Epsilon
 Sigma Pi
 Sigma Tau Gamma
 Theta Xi
 Triangle

Sororities
 Alpha Chi Omega
 Alpha Delta Pi
 Alpha Gamma Delta
 Alpha Kappa Alpha
 Alpha Xi Delta
 Beta Sigma Chi
 Chi Omega
 Delta Delta Delta
 Delta Sigma Theta
 Gamma Phi Beta
 Gamma Rho Lambda
 Kappa Alpha Theta
 Kappa Delta
 Kappa Kappa Gamma
 Lambda Theta Nu
 Pi Beta Phi
 Sigma Alpha Iota
 Sigma Kappa
 Sigma Lambda Gamma
 Sigma Gamma Rho
 Tau Beta Sigma
 Zeta Phi Beta
 Zeta Tau Alpha

Athletics 

Intercollegiate sports began at Kansas State in the 1890s. The school's sports teams are called the Wildcats, and they participate in the NCAA Division I and the Big 12 Conference. The official school color is Royal Purple, making Kansas State one of very few schools (alongside Syracuse and Harvard) that have only one official color. White and silver are commonly used as complementary colors; white is mentioned with purple in the university's fight song "Wildcat Victory." The athletics logo is a stylized Wildcat head in profile usually featured in the school color, called the "Powercat."

Sports sponsored by the school include football, basketball, cross country and track, baseball, golf, tennis, rowing, women's soccer, and volleyball. The head football coach is Chris Klieman, the head men's basketball coach is Jerome Tang, the head women's basketball coach is Jeff Mittie, and the head baseball coach is Pete Hughes. In 2012−2013, Kansas State became only the second Big 12 school to win conference titles in football, men's basketball, and baseball in the same school year.

Historically, African-American athletes at Kansas State were responsible for breaking the modern "color barrier" in Big Seven Conference athletics. Harold Robinson became the first African-American athlete in the conference in more than two decades and the first ever to receive a scholarship, playing football for Kansas State in 1949. In the spring of 1951 the conference's baseball color barrier was broken by Kansas State's Earl Woods, and in the winter of 1951–1952 Kansas State's Gene Wilson broke the conference color barrier in basketball (together with LaVannes Squires at the University of Kansas).

Notable people

Alumni 
Beginning with the first graduating class in 1867, a number of Kansas State alumni have gone on to distinguished careers. The 46th Governor of Kansas, who served as Ambassador-at-Large for International Religious Freedom under President Donald Trump, Sam Brownback, and one U.S. Senator from Kansas, Pat Roberts, are graduates of Kansas State University. Other graduates currently serve as the vice-president of Liberia, the president of the Georgia Institute of Technology, and the president of the University of the Virgin Islands. Kansas State alumni have been enshrined in the Rock and Roll Hall of Fame and the College Football Hall of Fame, served as Chairman of the Joint Chiefs of Staff, and have earned Emmy Awards and Olympic gold medals. Geraldine L. Richmond, the National Medal of Science laureate (2013) and Priestley Medalist (2018), received a B.S. in chemistry in 1975.

Faculty 
In line with its roots as a land grant college, a number of Kansas State's most eminent faculty in its earliest years were in the areas of agriculture, science and military. For example, famed geologist Benjamin Franklin Mudge was chair of the geology department, while famed Army officer Andrew Summers Rowan, the subject of the essay A Message to Garcia, served as professor of military tactics.

Kansas State faculty have received a number of awards. Fred Albert Shannon was awarded the Pulitzer Prize for History in 1929, while teaching history at Kansas State. In 2008, CASE and the Carnegie Foundation for the Advancement of Teaching honored Michael Wesch as national Professor of the Year. At least eight Kansas State faculty members have gone on to serve as university presidents, including Naomi B. Lynn, the first Hispanic female president of an American public university.

See also 
 June 1966 tornado outbreak sequence
 International Food Safety Network

Further reading 
 Kansas : A Cyclopedia of State History, Embracing Events, Institutions, Industries, Counties, Cities, Towns, Prominent Persons, Etc; 3 Volumes; Frank W. Blackmar; Standard Publishing Co; 944 / 955 / 824 pages; 1912. (Volume1 – 54 MB PDF), (Volume2 – 53 MB PDF), (Volume3 – 33 MB PDF)

Notes

References

External links 

 
 Kansas State Athletics website
 

 
Land-grant universities and colleges
Education in Riley County, Kansas
Public universities and colleges in Kansas
Educational institutions established in 1863
1863 establishments in Kansas
Manhattan, Kansas
Universities and colleges accredited by the Higher Learning Commission